Joel Thomas Broyhill (November 4, 1919 – September 24, 2006) was an American politician aligned with the Republican Party who served as a Congressman from Virginia for 11 terms, from 1953 to 1974. He represented Virginia's 10th congressional district, consisting of  suburbs of Arlington, Falls Church and sections of Fairfax County and Alexandria, and became known for his advocacy for federal workers (and constituent services) as well as his opposition to integration in the 1950s and 1960s.

Early life and education
Although according to family genealogy, the first Broyhill emigrated to Halifax County, Virginia, in the 18th century, Joel Broyhill's grandfather, Thomas Jefferson Broyhill (1852–1935) had been born near Moravian Falls in Wilkes County, North Carolina, the son of William Broyhill, a farmer and miller who also taught school following the Civil War. Thomas Broyhill became a carpenter and millwright, then leading citizen of the area as he established sawmills and other businesses. Joel's father Marvin Talmadge Broyhill Sr. moved his family to Hopewell, Virginia, to follow an uncle who worked for the DuPont Powder Company. M.T. Broyhill occasionally worked for DuPont, as well as established a real estate business which thrived until the plant closed. At the age of eighteen, Broyhill moved to Arlington, Virginia, when his father relocated his building and real estate firm, M.T. Broyhill & Sons Corporation (in part developing housing near Front Royal, Virginia, where DuPont established a cellulose factory). He then attended George Washington University from 1939 to 1941.

Military service and real estate career
In February 1942, Joel Broyhill enlisted in the United States Army. He served in European Theater as a captain in the 106th Infantry Division. He narrowly escaped death when Allied planes bombed the Nazis, and suffered what proved to be lifetime partial hearing loss from the explosions. Captured by the Germans during the Battle of the Bulge, Broyhill escaped six months later from a prisoner-of-war camp and rejoined advancing U.S. forces. He was released from active duty November 1, 1945. Among his military awards was a Bronze Star Medal.

After the war, Broyhill rejoined his family's real estate firm, where he became partner and general manager.

Politics
He was president of the Arlington County Chamber of Commerce and chairman of the Arlington County Planning Commission. In 1950 he was elected president of the Arlington Republican Club.

Elected to Congress
In 1952 he ran for Congress in a bid to become the first representative of Virginia's new , located in the inner suburbs of Washington, D.C. Broyhill won on his 33rd birthday, defeating Democrat Edmund D. Campbell by 322 votes and riding the coattails of the Dwight D. Eisenhower and Republican Party landslide that year.  He won his next ten elections but lost during the Democratic landslide in 1974 in the wake of the Watergate scandal and the resignation of President Richard Nixon.  Broyhill's district had been carved out of the old , then represented by Howard W. "Judge" Smith, a legendary and powerful Democrat who controlled legislation through his chairmanship of the House Rules Committee.  The Washington Post wrote

Congressional career
After taking office, Broyhill developed a reputation for assisting federal employees, as well as constituent service that became legendary. A messenger came to his office every 30 minutes to pick up the Western Union telegrams his office would fire off to government agencies on behalf of constituents.

The Washington Post wrote:

Broyhill served on the powerful House Ways and Means Committee, as well as the House Post Office and Civil Service Committee. In 1963, he was joined in the House by his distant cousin Jim Broyhill, also a Republican and who had won an unexpected victory in North Carolina's 9th congressional district, and who would also become known for his constituent services. Congressman Frank Wolf later noted:

On national issues, Broyhill supported the Republican legislative programs of Eisenhower and Nixon. In the Democratic administrations of John F. Kennedy and Lyndon B. Johnson, he opposed programs of the New Frontier and the Great Society.

Broyhill also became known as a strident opponent of integration.  In 1955, he was one 81 US Representatives who vowed to oppose by "every lawful means", the U.S. Supreme Court holding in Brown v. Board of Education which outlawed segregation. He and Richard Harding Poff of Virginia were the only two Republicans to sign the Southern Manifesto. Broyhill voted against the Civil Rights Acts of 1957, 1960, 1964, and 1968, and the Voting Rights Act of 1965, but voted in favor of the 24th Amendment to the U.S. Constitution. As a longtime member of the committee overseeing the District of Columbia he, along with three other members of Congress, recommended that schools in the District reinstitute segregation.

Broyhill in 1972 voiced opposition towards the federal subsidization of housing in Washington, D.C. suburbs, lamenting that it "smacks of forced integration".
 
In 1974 he announced his intention to retire, but was persuaded to seek another term at the request of Vice President Gerald R. Ford.  He ended up losing to Democrat Joseph L. Fisher, as the GOP suffered landslide defeats in reaction to the Watergate scandal. His defeat was considered one of the biggest upsets nationally that year.

After leaving office, he served as campaign manager for Republican John W. Warner's successful first run for U.S. Senate in the 1978 election, but primarily he was involved with real estate.  His firm developed several neighborhoods in Northern Virginia, including Broyhill McLean Estates, Broyhill Forest, and Sterling Park.

Death and legacy 
Broyhill died at his home in Arlington, Virginia, of congestive heart failure and pneumonia on September 24, 2006. He is buried at Arlington National Cemetery. In 2000, Congress named the postal building at 8409 Lee Hwy. in Merrifield, Virginia, after Broyhill, though no plaque remains in public areas.  His papers are held among the special collections of George Mason University.

References

External links
 Retrieved on 2008-02-18
Political Graveyard

1919 births
2006 deaths
People from Hopewell, Virginia
George Washington University alumni
People from Arlington County, Virginia
Military personnel from Virginia
American prisoners of war in World War II
World War II prisoners of war held by Germany
United States Army officers
Burials at Arlington National Cemetery
Republican Party members of the United States House of Representatives from Virginia
20th-century American politicians
American segregationists